The State Council was a body of state power in the People's Republic of Bulgaria from 1971 to 1989. It was the collective head of state before the creation of the office of President in 1989. It operated similarly to the Presidium of the Supreme Soviet of the Soviet Union, being an organ of the Bulgarian National Assembly.

History 
The decision to create a State Council was made at a meeting of the Central Committee of the Bulgarian Communist Party in 1968. It was created by the 1971 Zhivkov Constitution, taking over most of the powers performed by the Presidium of the National Assembly. It was formed to reinforce the philosophy of democratic centralism as specified by the committee. Members were elected to the first State Council on 8 July 1971, after the new constitution was approved via a national referendum held in May 1971. In April 1990, the State Council was abolished and replaced by the office of president of the republic.

Members 
The State Council consists of the following:

 Chairman
 First Vice-Chairmen
 Vice-Chairmen
 Secretary
 Members

The position of chairman was synonymous with the General Secretary of the Bulgarian Communist Party. In such a situation, the State Council was analogous to the current power structure in China, where the country's paramount leader serves as President, but derives his real power from his post as party leader. Members of the State Council are all the members and candidate members of the Politburo of the Central Committee of the BKP.

List of chairmen of the State Council

Secretaries 
Secretary of the State Council:

 Nikola Manolov (1976–1989)
 Angel Dimitrov (December 17, 1989 – April 3, 1990)

Powers 
The State Council officially defined as an executive committee of the Assembly. The Constitution vested the State Council with the power to, when the National Assembly was not in session, issue decrees without the requirement of submitting them to the National Assembly for approval. As chairman of the council for nearly all of its existence, Todor Zhivkov served as Supreme Commander in Chief of the Bulgarian People's Army.

References 

Government of Bulgaria
People's Republic of Bulgaria
1989 disestablishments in Romania